Mrakśa (Sanskrit; Tibetan phonetic: chabpa) is a Buddhist term translated as "concealment" or "slyness-concealment". It is defined as concealing or covering up one's faults or uncommendable actions, from either oneself or others. It is one of the twenty subsidiary unwholesome mental factors within the Mahayana Abhidharma teachings.

The Abhidharma-samuccaya states:

What is slyness-concealment? It is to perpetuate a state of unresolvedness because of its association with dullness and stubbornness [gti-ruug] when one is urged towards something positive. Slyness-concealment has the function of preventing one from making it clean break with it and feeling relieved.

Alan Wallace states: "Concealment from one's own vices is a type of delusion that stems from ignorance. This includes self-concealment."

See also 
 Mental factors (Buddhism)

References

Sources

External links 
 Ranjung Yeshe wiki entry for  'chab pa
 Primary Minds and the 51 Mental Factors

Unwholesome factors in Buddhism
Sanskrit words and phrases